is a passenger railway station in located in the city of  Hirakata, Osaka Prefecture, Japan, operated by West Japan Railway Company (JR West).

Lines
Fujisaka Station is served by the Katamachi Line (Gakkentoshi Line), and is located 20.2 kilometers from the starting point of the line at Kizu Station.

Station layout
The station has a single elevated island platform with the station building underneath. The station is staffed.

Platforms

Adjacent stations

History
The station was opened on 1 October 1979. 

Station numbering was introduced in March 2018 with Fujisaka being assigned station number JR-H28.

Passenger statistics
In fiscal 2019, the station was used by an average of 3,216 passengers daily (boarding passengers only).

Surrounding area
 Japan National Route 307
Hotani River
Hirakata City Hall Tsuda Branch
Hirakata City Tsuda Library
Hirakata City Tsuda Public Hall

References

External links

 Official home page 

Railway stations in Japan opened in 1979
Railway stations in Osaka Prefecture
Hirakata, Osaka